Alytarches in ancient Olympic games was the leader of the police force who assisted the Hellanodikai to impose fines on athletes who did not follow the rules. The rabdouchoi, rod-bearers, and mastigophoroi, scourge-bearers, carried out the punishments. If an athlete could not pay a fine, his hometown paid it for him.

Sources
Olympic victor lists and ancient Greek history  by Paul Christesen Page 510 
Sport in the Ancient World from A to Z By Mark Golden Page 7 
http://ablemedia.com/ctcweb/consortium/ancientolympics7.html

Ancient Olympic Games